Lương Thế Vinh (1441–1496) was an prominent Vietnamese scholar and mathematician of the fifteenth century.

Life
Lương Thế Vinh was born in the district of Vụ Bản, Nam Định Province, and during the mid-15th century. He obtained doctorate in 1463 or 1478, during the reign of Le Thanh Tong, the golden era of Vietnamese scholarship. He co-worked with Vũ Hựu, another scholar, and introduced Chinese mathematical methods into Vietnam.

Works
Math:
 Great Compendium of Mathematical Methods–Đại thành Toán pháp (edited). 
 Khải minh Toán học

Chèo:
 Hý phường phả lục

Buddhism:
 Thiền môn Khoa giáo

References

Citations

Sources

 
 
 

Vietnamese mathematicians
People from Nam Định province
Lê dynasty officials
1441 births
1496 deaths
15th-century mathematicians